Mohammed Shbair (born 16 December 1986 in Gaza, Palestine) is a Palestinian footballer. He plays as a goalkeeper for Shabab Al-Khaleel of the West Bank Premier League and Palestine. His first call-up to the national team came during the 2006 AFC Challenge Cup. He received his first cap in a 1-1 draw against Jordan in the first FIFA-sanctioned match to be held in Palestine. He has saved two penalties while playing for the national team the first in a 3-0 friendly loss to Iraq in 2009 and the second in a crucial 2014 FIFA World Cup qualifier against Thailand.

References

1986 births
Living people
Palestinian footballers
People from Gaza City
Footballers at the 2006 Asian Games
Association football goalkeepers
Asian Games competitors for Palestine
Palestine international footballers